Mordellistena brachyacantha is a beetle in the genus Mordellistena of the family Mordellidae. It was described in 1994 by Franciscolo.

References

brachyacantha
Beetles described in 1994